Laurence Reginald Ward Johnson,  (born 7 February 1927) is an English composer and bandleader who has written scores for dozens of film and television series and has been one of the most highly regarded arrangers of instrumental pop and swing music since the 1950s with works often serving as stock production music.

Career
Johnson was born in Hampstead, England, and studied at the Royal College of Music in London, and spent four years in the Coldstream Guards before moving to the entertainment industry in the 1950s. One of his first major projects was as composer and music director in a musical adaptation of Henry Fielding's Rape Upon Rape, entitled Lock Up Your Daughters (1959), which opened in Bernard Miles' Mermaid Theatre. The score, with lyrics by Lionel Bart, won an Ivor Novello Award. Johnson's stage work included music for the Peter Cook revue, Pieces of Eight (1959), and The Four Musketeers (1967), starring Harry Secombe.

In 1961, Johnson entered the UK Singles Chart with "Sucu Sucu", the theme music from the UK television series Top Secret. It was in this area of television scoring that he was to be most prolific. From the 1960s to the 1980s, he composed over fifty themes and scores, including the theme used on This Is Your Life (entitled "Gala Performance"), The Avengers (from 1965), Animal Magic (entitled "Las Vegas"), Jason King, The New Avengers and The Professionals. He was one of the founders, with Albert Fennell and Brian Clemens, of Mark One Productions, the television production company responsible for The New Avengers and The Professionals.

Johnson was responsible for the theme music to the BBC Radio 1 series Sounds of Jazz, introduced by Peter Clayton and broadcast on Sunday evenings from October 1973 onwards.

Johnson's film scores included The Good Companions, The Moonraker (1958), Tiger Bay, Dr. Strangelove, First Men in the Moon, You Must Be Joking!, And Soon the Darkness, Captain Kronos – Vampire Hunter and Diagnosis: Murder (the 1975 Christopher Lee film). Among his other works was the music for the television film, Mister Jerico, which involved many of the original Avengers team, including Patrick Macnee.

Johnson released several recordings on the Unicorn-Kanchana label. These included his own compositions The Royal Tour, The Wind in the Willows and Symphony: Synthesis for a large ensemble comprising a jazz orchestra and symphony orchestra. Originally released by EMI Records, Symphony featured several famous jazz names including Tubby Hayes, Don Lusher, Joe Harriott, Kenny Wheeler and Stan Tracey, as well as the London Philharmonic Orchestra. Johnson also released an album of music from The Avengers, The New Avengers and The Professionals, an album of his scores for The First Men in the Moon, Dr Strangelove and Captain Kronos, and two albums of the compositions of others: the film music of Dmitri Tiomkin, and Bernard Herrmann's suite for North by Northwest.

Since 1997, Johnson has toured with the band he formed, The London Big Band. Their "Theme From 'The Professionals'" peaked on the UK Singles Chart at number 36 in May 1997. He has also provided DVD commentaries on several of the series in which he has been involved. Many of Johnson's works have since become stock music for a number of animated series, including SpongeBob SquarePants and Ren And Stimpy.

Johnson was appointed Member of the Order of the British Empire (MBE) in the 2014 Birthday Honours for services to music.

Film credits 

The Good Companions (1957)
The Moonraker (1958)
Girls at Sea (1958)
No Trees in the Street (1959)
Tiger Bay (1959)
Operation Bullshine (1959)
I Aim at the Stars (1960)
Spare The Rod (1961)
What a Whopper (1961)
Siege of the Saxons (1963)
Bitter Harvest (1963)
Dr. Strangelove (1964)
First Men in the Moon (1964)
East of Sudan (1964)
The Beauty Jungle (1964)
You Must Be Joking! (1965)
Hot Millions (1968)
Mister Jerico (1970)
And Soon the Darkness (1970)
The Firechasers (1971)
Captain Kronos – Vampire Hunter (1972)
The Belstone Fox (1973)
The Maids (1974)
Hedda (1975)
Diagnosis: Murder (1975)
It Shouldn't Happen to a Vet (1976)
A Hazard of Hearts (1987)
It's Alive III: Island of the Alive (1987)
The Lady and the Highwayman (1989)
A Ghost in Monte Carlo (1990)

Television credits 
No Hiding Place (1959)
Top Secret (1961)
Animal Magic (1962)
Riviera Police (1965)
The Avengers (1965)
This Is Your Life (1969)
Red Gauntlet (1970)
Shirley's World (1971)
Jason King (1971)
Thriller (1973)
The New Avengers (1976)
The Professionals (1977)
W1A (2014) - same theme as Animal Magic

Notable stock tracks
"Blood in the Gutter" (from "Two Cities" Suite) KPM
"Fisticuffs" (fight music from "The Avengers") KPM
"Gala Performance" (theme from "This Is Your Life") KPM
"Happy Go Lively" KPM
"Lonely Stranger" (from "The Avengers", Episode: "Joker") KPM
"Shopping Spree" KPM

References

External links

Official website (archived)
Artist page at Bucks Music Group

1927 births
Living people
English film score composers
English male film score composers
Light music composers
English television composers
English male composers
People from Hampstead
British bandleaders
Members of the Order of the British Empire
Alumni of the Royal College of Music